Coastal Konjo is an Austronesian language of Sulawesi, Indonesia, which belongs to the Makassaric branch of the South Sulawesi subgroup. It is spoken along the coast in the southeastern corner of South Sulawesi in the regencies of Sinjai, Bulukumba and Bantaeng. It is closely related to, but distinct from Highland Konjo, which also belongs to the Makassaric languages.

Phonology
The following sound inventory is based on Friberg & Friberg (1991).

The vowel  is realized as  before geminate nasals.

Only  and  can appear in final position. Words with underlying final ,  or  add an echo vowel, e.g.   'thin'.

Grammar 
Personal pronouns in Coastal Konjo have one independent form, and three bound forms.

References

Languages of Sulawesi
South Sulawesi languages